Tom Mennard (11 February 1918 – 2 November 1989) was an English comedian and actor. Mennard had a long career in variety, radio and television.

Mennard was born in Beeston, Leeds, the son of an undertaker. He subsequently settled in Brighton where he worked as bus driver. Whilst in Brighton he became involved in an amateur revue company where his performances attracted the attention of singer Donald Peers, who was appearing in variety in the town. On Peers' recommendation Mennard got an audition for the BBC and as a result was given a spot on The Centre Show, a television programme for new talent presented by Benny Hill.

Following Hill's advice he auditioned for the Windmill Theatre and, after two rejections, was accepted with a routine in which he played a road sweeper. His first appearances at the theatre were alongside Bill Waddington and Jill Summers. Variety and theatre work followed, including a tour with Harold Fielding's Music for the Millions during which Mennard worked with his idol Robb Wilton, whose slow, deliberate style of story-telling was the main influence on Mennard's own delivery style. He also made several appearances on BBC TV's long running variety programme, The Good Old Days, at The City Varieties Theatre in Leeds, his home town.

Mennard became a regular feature on Mike Craig's radio shows in Manchester and these helped him to reach a wider national audience. His radio work included his own show, Local Tales. He also managed a handful of film appearances, including the horror The Flesh and Blood Show and the sexploitation film Four Dimensions of Greta.

On television he made appearances in Dad's Army, Open All Hours and Harry Worth vehicle Oh Happy Band!, amongst others. In 1985 he joined the cast of Coronation Street in the role of Sam Tindall, remaining in the part irregularly until 1989, with his real life dog Dougal also featuring as the character's pet.

Mennard died from cancer in 1989 at Salisbury hospital. He was 71.

External links

References

1918 births
1998 deaths
Comedians from Yorkshire
English male comedians
English male soap opera actors
English radio personalities
Male actors from Leeds
People from Beeston, Leeds
Deaths from cancer in England
20th-century English comedians